Bandar Tenggara is a town in Kota Tinggi District, Johor, Malaysia.

History
Similar to Bandar Penawar, the township was established around the year 1972 by Lembaga Kemajuan Johor Tenggara (Southeast Johor Development Authority) (KEJORA).

Geology
The town is surrounded by oil palm estate.

Geography
The town spans over an area of 20 km2.

Economy
The industrial development especially in the manufacturing sector and small and medium industries here growth rapidly due to its strategic position that links between the regions centre of Kulai, Kota Tinggi and Kluang.

Education

Secondary school
Sekolah Menengah Kebangsaan Bandar Tenggara 2
Sekolah Menengah Kebangsaan Bandar Tenggara
Sekolah Menengah Kebangsaan Seri Pinang
Sekolah Menengah Agama Bandar Tenggara

Primary school
Sekolah Kebangsaan Bandar Tenggara 1
Sekolah Kebangsaan Felda Sungai Sibol
Sekolah Kebangsaan Felda Pengeli Timur
Sekolah Kebangsaan Bandar Tenggara 2

References

Kota Tinggi District
Towns in Johor